Avinangudi is a village panchayat located in the Cuddalore district of Tamil-Nadu state, India. The latitude of Avinangudi is 11.3851707 and its longitude is 79.1606569. Chennai is the state capital for Avinangudi village. It is located around 226.3 kilometer away from Avinangudi. The nearest state capital from Avinangudi is Pondicherry and its distance is 95.5 km. The other surrounding state capitals are Pondicherry 95.5 km., Bangalore 247.6 km., Thiruvananthapuram 392.3 km.

The surrounding nearby villages and its distance from Avinangudi are Pothiramangalam 1.0 km, Kodangudi 2.5 km, Vaiyangudi 3.3 km, Sirumulai 5.0 km, Perumulai 5.0 km, Keelacheruvai 7.3 km, Sevveri 7.7 km, Nidhinatham 9.0 km, E.keeranur 9.5 km, Meladhanur 10.2 km, Akkanur 11.6 km, Pullur 11.8 km, Korakkai 12.6 km, Vagaiyur 13.8 km, T.eandal 14.0 km, Avatti 14.2 km, Kallur 15.3 km, S.naraiyur 15.6 km, Arangur 15.8 km, Thondankurichi 16.2 km, Ma.podaiyur 16.4 km, Sirukarambalur 16.6 km, Tholudur 17.1 km, Ezhuthur 17.2 km, Ramanatham 17.2 km, Vinayaganandal 18.2 km, Lakkur 18.3 km, Kandamathan 18.3 km, Ma.pudur 20.5 km, Mangalur 20.8 km, Ma.kothanur 22.0 km, Pulikarambalur 22.8 km, Adari 23.1 km, Keelakalpoondi 23.1 km, Rettakurichi 24.0 km, Orangur 24.6 km, Vadakarampoondi 26.1 km, S.pudur 27.4 km, Vallimaduram 27.5 km, Korakkavadi 27.6 km, and Panaiyandur 29.0 km.

The official language of Avinangudi 

The native language of Avinangudi is Tamil. In many of the villages in the Avinangudi region,  people communicate primarily, via the  Tamil language.

Avinangudi sun rise time 
Avinangudi village is located in the UTC 5.30 time zone and it follows Indian standard time (IST). Avinangudi sun rise time varies by approximately 13 minutes from IST. The vehicle driving side in Avinangudi is the left. All vehicles should take left side during driving. Avinangudi residents use its national currency which is Indian Rupee and its international currency code is INR. Avinangudi phones and mobile numbers can be accessed by adding the Indian country dialing code +91 from abroad. Avinangudi people are following the dd/mm/yyyy date format in day-to-day life. Avinangudi domain name extension (country code top-level domain (cTLD)) is '.in'.

The nearest railway station in and around Avinangudi 
The nearest railway station to Avinangudi is Pennadam which is located around 6.7 km away. The following table shows other railway stations and their distance from Mamakudi.

Nearest airport to Avinangudi 
Avinangudi's nearest airport is Thanjavur Air Force Station situated at 73.5 km distance. Few more airports around Avinangudi are as follows.

Nearest districts to Avinangudi 
Avinangudi is located around 75.7 kilometer away from its district headquarter, Cuddalore. The other nearest district headquarters is Ariyalur situated at 29.7 km distance from Avinangudi. Surrounding districts from Avinangudi are as follows.

Nearest town/city to Avinangudi 
Avinangudi's nearest town/city/important place is Tittakudi located at the distance of 3.0 kilometer. Surrounding town/city/TP/CT from Avinangudi are as follows.

Schools in and around Avinangudi 
Avinangudi nearest schools are listed as follows.

Beaches in and around Avinangudi 
Avinangudi's nearest beach is Parankipatai Beach located at the distance of 66.4 km. Surrounding beaches from Avinangudi are as follows.

References

Villages in Cuddalore district